Veierland is a populated, carfree island in Færder municipality, Norway. A ferry service operated by Jutøya AS connects the island with the nearby, larger island of Nøtterøy. The island also has a permanent ferry link to Engø peninsula in nearby Sandefjord. Veierland lies in the Tønsberg Fjord, south of Nøtterøy Island, and west of Tjøme Island. The island measures 4.4 square kilometers and has approximately 150 full-time residents. It lies just east of Sandefjord, connected by a 10-15 minute ferry ride onboard MF Jutøya. As of 2015, Veierland is home to 450 vacation homes and 150 full-time residents. It is a car-free island, but residents may have permits for driving mopeds and tractors. Its church was established in 1905, while Veierland School closed in 2013.

Veierland is primarily a summer community and has a 17-kilometer shoreline. Popular beaches for bathing are Kjølholmen, Hverveodden, and Kongshavn. Places for accommodation and eateries are open during the summer months.

The name

The Norse form of the name was Vájir, the plural of vá 'inlet' (referring to the deep and narrow inlets on the southern part of the island). The last element land 'land; island' is a later addition.

Description
Veierland Island has been inhabited for as long as Vestfold County. The island has a permanent year-round population of about 150 people as of 2010, however, the island experiences significant summer tourism. Over 450 vacation homes can be found on the island. Veierland is connected to the mainland by daily ferries from Tenvik at Nøtterøy and from Engø peninsula in Sandefjord. Between 9-17 daily ferries connect the island to the mainland. Convenience stores, a golf course, and restaurants are operated on the island during summers, although most services are closed outside the tourist season. The island is primarily car-free, but residents may acquire permits for vehicles such as tractors, golf carts, and ATVs. Besides its boat harbors, beaches, and cabin communities, the island remains densely forested with much agricultural activity.

Demographics

The island was populated by between 300-400 people in the early 1900s, but the population later decreased to under 100. As of 2012, the island has a population of 150 permanent residents but the population more than doubles during summers when many of the island’s 450 vacation homes are utilized. It is a current goal of the municipality to increase the island’s year-round population to 300.

Veierland has experienced a population decline in recent years, and the population decreased by 12 percent from 2012 to 2017. While the island had a permanent population of 158 in 2012, the population was 111 as of 2017. The school on the island was shut down in 2013 and the library closed in 2014. Several residents argued for the island to be transferred into the municipality of Sandefjord following the 2017 municipal reform. The island had a residence duty policy (Norwegian: boplikt) from 1998-2012. Half of the homes sold on the island since 2012 are used as vacation homes.

Notability

Author Jens Bjørneboe purchased a home on Veierland from singer-songwriter Ole Paus and lived on the island until his death on May 9, 1976. Ole Paus has written a song entitled “Veierland” (on the album “Stjerner i rennesteinen”) about the island, while author Karin Bang has written three novels in which the island goes by the name Jutøy. Artist Edvard Munch spent the summer of 1887 on the island, and painted numerous works while visiting on Veierland.

Wildlife
Veierland is known for its high population of deer. 78 deer were hunted here during 2001.

References

External links
 Veierland Homepage

Nøtterøy
Islands of Vestfold og Telemark